Frías is a common Spanish surname. Its Portuguese counterpart is Frias (with no accent) and its English counterpart is Fryas. It is the middle name, last name, apellido materno, or apellido paterno, of several people:

Duke of Frías, a hereditary title created in 1492 by King Ferdinand II of Aragon, and used by several persons throughout Spanish history
Adán Chávez Frías (born 1953), Venezuelan politician
Alonso de Salazar Frías (c. 1564–1636), known as "The Witches’ Advocate" during the Spanish Inquisition
Aníbal José Chávez Frías (1957–2016), Colombian politician
Arturo Frias (born 1956), American boxer
Charles Frias (1922–2006), American businessman and philanthropist
Elena Frías de Chávez (born 1935), mother of Venezuelan president Hugo Chávez
Fany Santa Chalas Frias (born 1993), Dominican sprinter
Gabriela Frías (born 1971), Mexican journalist and television host
Gustavo Martínez Frías (1935–2009), Colombian Catholic archbishop
Hanley Frías (born 1973), Dominican baseball player
Hugo Chávez Frías (1954–2013), Venezuelan president
Joaquín de Frías y Moya (1784–1851), Spanish military figure and politician
Jonathan Faña Frías (born 1987), Dominican footballer
Jorge Frias de Paula (1906–?), Brazilian swimmer
José Salvador Arco Frías (born 1984), Spanish basketball player
Juan Antonio de Frías y Escalante (1633–1669), Spanish painter
Juan Carlos Sánchez Frías (born 1956), Argentine-Bolivian footballer
Julio Daniel Frías (born 1979), Mexican footballer
Ligia Elena Hernández Frías (born 1985), Venezuelan pageant titleholder
Luis Frías (baseball) (born 1998), Dominican baseball player
Luiz Frias (born 1964), Brazilian chairman of the board of directors of Grupo Folha
Maguilaura Frias (born 1997), Peruvian volleyball player
Mário Frias (born 1971), Brazilian telenovela actor
Mariangela Soleil Frias Trinidad (born 1986), known as Panky Trinidad, Filipina singer
Octávio Frias de Oliveira (1912–2007), Brazilian businessman and CEO of Grupo Folha
Otávio Frias Filho  (1957–2018), Brazilian editorial director of Grupo Folha
Paula Frías Allende (1963–1992), Chilean humanitarian
Pepe Frías (born 1948), Dominican baseball player
Ramón Ortega y Frías (1825–1883), Spanish writer
Refugio Pérez Frías (1913–1993), known as Isabela Corona, Mexican actress
Ricardo Rojas Frías (born 1955), Cuban boxer
Roberto Gutiérrez Frías (born 1962), known as El Dandy, Mexican wrestler
Tomás Frías Ametller (1804–1884), Bolivian president
Tony Frias (born 1979), American footballer
Victor Frias Pablaza (1956–2005), Chilean chess master
Xavier Romero Frías (born 1954), Catalan Spanish writer and scholar